This is a list of seasons of the ECHL since its inception.

list